Estadio Ruca Che is an indoor arena and multi-purpose stadium in the city of Neuquén, capital of Neuquén province and largest city in Patagonia. It was built in 1995 to host the Americas Basketball Championship.

The name of this sport venue is in mapuche language: the word Ruka means house while Che means people. Therefore, this is the House of the People.

Two teams make use of this stadium regularly: Gigantes del Sur plays its home matches for the Serie A1, the top level of the Argentine men's volleyball league system, while Independiente de Neuquén plays some of their home matches for the Torneo Federal de Básquetbol, the third level of the Argentine basketball league system, after the Liga Nacional de Básquet and the Torneo Nacional de Ascenso.

It also has an auxiliary gym, outdoor basketball courts and volleyball facilities, and parking lot for 150 vehicles.

Sporting events

1995 Americas Basketball Championship
2001 Americas Basketball Championship

Shows

Some of the artists that have played at this stadium are Alejandro Lerner, Attaque 77, Bersuit Vergarabat, Catupecu Machu, Charly García, Chayanne, Diego Torres, Divididos, Europe, Joan Manuel Serrat, Jorge Rojas, La Ley, La Renga, Los Piojos, La Mona Jiménez, León Gieco, Luis Eduardo Aute, Los Nocheros, Maná, Mercedes Sosa, Víctor Heredia, Marco Antonio Solís, Ismael Serrano, Soledad Pastorutti, The Wailers, Manu Chao, Gustavo Cerati, Celia Cruz, Ricardo Montaner, José Luis Perales, Marcos Witt, Danilo Montero, Violetta, Roxette, Les Luthiers, No Te Va Gustar, Ricky Martin and Calle 13.

References 

Indoor arenas in Argentina
Basketball venues in Argentina
Volleyball venues in Argentina